Znamenka Street is a street in Khamovniki District of Moscow. It runs from Borovitskaya Square to Arbatskaya Square, lies between Kolymazhny Lane and Vozdvizhenka Street. The numbering of houses is carried out from Borovitskaya Square.

Etymology
The name appeared at the end of the 16th century and it is named after the Church of the Sign of the Most Holy Theotokos (demolished in 1931). After the Russian Revolution, Znamenka was renamed into Krasnoznamyonnaya Street, and in 1925 into Frunze Street - in honor of the famous Soviet military leader Mikhail Frunze, who died in the same year, who worked in the building of the Revolutionary Military Council located on the street. In 1990, the street was reverted to its original name.

References

Streets in Moscow